Santa Elena Poco Uinic (also known as just Poco Uinic) is a Classic Maya site in Chiapas, Mexico. It contains Stela 3, that has the date 9.17.19.13.16 5 K'ib' 14 Ch'en and a glyph that indicates an eclipse. An eclipse was recorded as occurring on July 16, 790 CE O.S., so this find has frequently been proposed as a way to establish a correlation between the Maya Calendar and the Julian Calendar.

Chiapas
Maya Classic Period